Valentin Ruslyakov (born 3 February 1972), also sometimes spelled Valentyn Rusliakov, is a Ukrainian judoka. He represented Ukraine at the 2000 Summer Olympics competing in the men's heavyweight category.

Achievements

References

  

1972 births
Living people
Ukrainian male judoka
Judoka at the 2000 Summer Olympics
Olympic judoka of Ukraine
Sportspeople from Donetsk Oblast